Gennadi Anatolyevich Denisov (born 20 August 1960) is an Uzbek professional football coach and a former player. His son Vitaliy Denisov is also a professional footballer.

Career
Denisov started his playing career at Pakhtachi Guliston from Guliston in 1977. After one year playing for Pakhtachi he joinedPakhtakor. The most of his career he played for Pakhtakor. He made his professional debut in the Soviet Top League in 1979 for Pakhtakor.

He was one of the player of Pakhtakor among Andrey Pyatnitskiy, Mirjalol Qosimov, Igor Shkvyrin, Khoren Oganesian and others who led club to promotion to Soviet Top League in 1991, after finishing runners-up in 1990 Soviet First League. Denisov is all-time most capped player of Pakhtakor with 371 caps ahed of Berador Abduraimov. Totally he capped 508 matches in all championships in his career.

In 1992, he moved to Spartak Vladikavkaz where he completed 3 seasons. Denisov played 2 games in the UEFA Cup 1993–94 for Spartak Vladikavkaz. In 1995-1997 he played at Navbahor Namangan and won championship in 1996.

International career
Denisov completed 5 matches for national team in 1992–1996. In 1996 AFC Asian Cup he played in all three matches of Uzbekistan in group stage.

Managing career
He started his coaching career in 1998 at Sergeli Tashkent. In 2001, he worked as assistant coach at Kimyogar Chirchiq. From 2010 to 2016 he was an assistant coach to Igor Shkvyrin at Olmaliq FK.

Honours

Club
Pakhtakor
Soviet First League runners-up: 1990

Spartak Vladikavkaz
 Russian Premier League runner-up: 1992

Navbahor Namangan
 Uzbek League (1): 1996
 Uzbek Cup (1): 1995
 Uzbek League 3rd (2): 1995, 1997

References

External links
 
 

1960 births
People from Sirdaryo Region
Living people
Soviet footballers
Uzbekistani footballers
Uzbekistan international footballers
1996 AFC Asian Cup players
Pakhtakor Tashkent FK players
PFC CSKA Moscow players
FC Spartak Vladikavkaz players
navbahor Namangan players
Soviet First League players
Russian Premier League players
Uzbekistani expatriate footballers
Expatriate footballers in Russia
Uzbekistani expatriate sportspeople in Russia
Association football defenders